This China War Memorial Medal, also known as the Medal in Commemoration of Victory in the Resistance Against Aggression was authorized after the Second Sino-Japanese War (World War II) by the Republic of China government for servicemen who assisted the Chinese Government fighting against the Japanese during the war.  Members of the Fourteenth Air Force, the Flying Tigers, were eligible to be awarded this medal. The medal was created in 1944 and first distributed in 1946 to those who met the requirements from the Chinese Nationalist Government.  Lt. General Claire Lee Chennault and Anna Chennault were a few who had received this medal.

Eligibility
Those eligible to get the China War Memorial Medal were those who served in Mainland China, Burma, Vietnam and Thailand for 30 days from the time period of December 7, 1941 – September 2, 1945.

Acceptance
This medal may be accepted under  which allows US personnel to wear this medal after all foreign decorations.

Description
The Marco Polo Bridge is on the obverse with two flags of the Republic of China and Chairman Chiang Kai-shek between the flags.  On the reverse, is a ribbon for an engraving of the service member's name or serial number.

A round metal Chinese sunburst emblem is placed in the center of the suspension and service ribbons.

References 

Orders, decorations, and medals of the Republic of China
Awards established in 1944
1944 establishments in China
Second Sino-Japanese War
Military awards and decorations of China